The University of Santo Tomas (also known as UST and officially as the Pontifical and Royal University of Santo Tomas, Manila) is a private, Catholic research university in Manila, Philippines. Founded on April 28, 1611, by Spanish friar Miguel de Benavides, third Archbishop of Manila, it has the oldest extant university charter in Asia, and is one of the world's largest Catholic universities in terms of enrollment found on one campus. It is the main campus of the University of Santo Tomas System that is run by the Order of Preachers.

UST was granted the title “Royal” by King Charles III of Spain in 1785. Pope Leo XIII made UST a "Pontifical" university in 1902. Pope Pius XII bestowed upon UST the title of “The Catholic University of the Philippines” in 1947. UST houses the first and oldest engineering, law, medical, and pharmacy schools in the country.

The main campus is the largest university in the city of Manila and is home to 22 degree-granting colleges, a parish church, and a teaching hospital. In 2011, four of the university's structures were declared National Cultural Treasures by the National Museum.

The university offers programs in over 180 undergraduate and graduate specializations. It has 26 programs recognized by the Commission on Higher Education (CHED) as Centers of Excellence and Centers of Development, ranking second in the country and first among private educational institutions. It is awarded with an institutional accreditation by the CHED through the Federation of Accrediting Agencies of the Philippines (FAAP). The university has the highest number of Philippine Association of Colleges and Universities' Commission on Accreditation (PACUCOA)-accredited programs in the country with 59.

UST alumni and faculty include 30 Catholic saints, 2 cardinals, 4 presidents of the Philippines, 9 chief justices, 20 national artists, a national scientist, and 5 billionaires. The athletic teams are the Growling Tigers, who are members of the University Athletic Association of the Philippines and have won 45 overall championships in 74 seasons.

History

The foundation of the university is ascribed to fray Miguel de Benavides, the third archbishop of Manila. He came to the Philippines with the first Dominican mission in 1587. He went on to become bishop of Nueva Segovia and was promoted archbishop of Manila in 1601. Upon his death in July 1605, Benavides bequeathed his library and personal property worth ₱1,500 to be used as the seed fund for the establishment of an institution of higher learning. In 1609, permission to open the college was requested from King Philip III of Spain, which only reached Manila in 1611. The university was founded on April 28, 1611. The act of foundation was signed by frays Baltasar Fort, Bernardo Navarro, and Francisco Minayo. Bernardo de Santa Catalina carried out Benavides's wishes and was able to secure a building near the Dominican church and convent in the walled city of Intramuros in Manila for the college. The authorities took the example of universities in Spain, such as the University of Salamanca and in Spanish America, such as the Royal and Pontifical University of Mexico to become a model for the university. UST was first called as the College of Our Lady of the Most Holy Rosary (Spanish: Colegio de Nuestra Señora del Santísimo Rosario), and in 1619, renamed Colegio de Santo Tomas, in honor of the Dominican theologian, St. Thomas Aquinas. On November 20, 1645, Pope Innocent X issued the papal bull In Supereminenti which elevated the Colegio de Santo Tomas to a university and placed it under papal authority.

Following the royal decree of Philip V of Spain in 1733 and bull of Pope Clement XII in 1734, the Facultad de Cánones (Faculty of Canon Law) and Facultad de Derecho (Faculty of Civil Law) were established.

The Royal Decree of May 20, 1865 from Queen Isabella II of Spain gave power to UST for the supervision of all secondary schools. Being the only institution of higher learning at that time, UST acted as the "Department of Education" of the country. In 1870 Segismundo Moret, the Minister of Overseas Colonies, issued a decree that converted Real y Pontificia Universidad de Santo Tomas into Real y Pontificia Universidad de Filipinas. In 1871, the Superior Gobierno de Filipinas issued a decree that established the Facultad de Medicina y Farmacia. UST was allowed to grant a licentiate degree in medicine. From 1877 to 1901, 329 students were granted the licentiate degree. José Rizal studied medicine in UST from 1878 to 1882. The university began granting the degree of Doctor of Medicine in 1902 during the new American system.

The university was registered on January 13, 1908, as a non-stock, non-profit educational institution under Act 1459 with the corporate name of Real y Pontificia Universidad de Santo Tomas de Manila. With the growing student population, the Dominicans were given a 21.5-hectare plot of land at the Sulucan Hills in Sampaloc, Manila and built its 215,000 square meter campus. In 1924, it began accepting female enrollees. The medicine and civil law courses were retained in Intramuros at that time.

During World War II, the Japanese forces converted UST into an internment camp for enemy aliens, mostly Americans, living in the Philippines. The original Intramuros campus was destroyed in 1944 by a fire started by the Japanese Kenpeitai. Over 3,700 internees were freed, 2,870 of whom were Americans, and over 600 were either killed or died from sickness or starvation in the internment camp for 37 months from January 1942 until February 11, 1945, when the camp was liberated by General Douglas MacArthur.

UST was given the title "Royal" by King Charles III of Spain in 1785, in recognition of the university's loyalty in defending Manila against the British troops. In 1974, then prince Juan Carlos I of Spain visited UST and was conferred doctor of laws honoris causa and the title Royal Patron, as a revival of the tradition dating back to 1680 when King Charles II of Spain was named the first patron. Queen Sofia of Spain, who visited with her husband in 1974, came back in 2012. In 1902, UST was officially declared a "pontifical university” by virtue of the Quae Mari Sinico, an apostolic constitution signed by Pope Leo XIII. As a pontifical university, UST has been visited by the pope four times since the 1970, Pope Paul VI in 1970, Pope John Paul II in 1981 and 1995, and by Pope Francis in 2015. During the quadricentennial celebration in 2011, Pope Benedict XV sent a special envoy and gave a video message. In 1947, Pope Pius XII bestowed the appellate name “The Catholic University of the Philippines."

UST's first Filipino rector was Leonardo Legaspi who served UST from 1971 to 1977. In 2019, UST had 40,375 students enrolled.

UST's recognition as the oldest extant university in the Philippines was disputed by the University of San Carlos. Since its establishment, the UST's academic life was interrupted only twice; from 1898 to 1899, during the Philippine Revolution against Spain, and from 1942 to 1945, during the Japanese occupation of the country. On December 1, 2010, the House of Representatives passed Resolution No. 51, "Resolution Congratulating the University of Santo Tomas on the occasion of its Quadricentennial Anniversary in 2011.", which read "founded on April 28, 1611 by Archbishop Miguel de Benavides" and "has the oldest extant university charter in the Philippines and Asia."

Campus

UST, the largest university in the city of Manila, sits on an almost perfect square of 21.5 hectares bounded by España Boulevard to the southeast, Padre Noval Street to the southwest, Lacson Avenue to the northeast, and Dapitan Street to the northwest. The university is 
part of the University Belt in Sampaloc, Manila. In 1927, the university transferred to its present campus when the Dominicans deemed the Intramuros campus inadequate for the university's growing population. The architectural style of the buildings greatly varies and depends on the period the building is constructed. Early structures were designed by university priests and professors who made use of styles in Renaissance Revival, Art Deco, Bauhaus, and International Style, among others. The campus has seen extensive developments in the last 2 decades as 10 out of the 21 major buildings were constructed from 2002 to 2019. The Main Building's capital, one of the iconic symbols of the university, has been adopted by several buildings, such as the Beato Angelico Building, Thomas Aquinas Research Complex, and the UST Hospital buildings. Seven buildings are also named after beatified Dominicans and Dominican saints.

The central axis of the campus comprises the Arch of the Centuries, the Benavides Monument, the Main Building, the Quadricentennial Square, the Miguel de Benavides Library, the Tan Yan Kee Student Center, and the upcoming Henry Sy Sr. Hall. Erected around 1680, the Arch of the Centuries served as the main entrance to the first campus in Intramuros. It was transferred to its present site in 1954. The Main Building, designed by the priest and engineer Roque Ruaño and built from 1924 to 1927, is an architectural jewel and everyone's image of UST. It was the first structure on the campus and once served as the Kilometer Zero of Manila. It houses the Faculty of Civil Law, the Faculty of Pharmacy, the College of Science, the Museum of Arts and Sciences, and the administrative offices.

The northeast quadrant of the campus includes the St. Raymund Penafort Building and the health and medical buildings. St. Raymund de Peñafort Building is built in International Style in 1955 and is home to the Faculty of Arts and Letters and the College of Commerce and Business Administration. Built in 1952, the Bauhaus-inspired San Martin de Porres Building houses the Faculty of Medicine and Surgery, the College of Nursing, and the College of Rehabilitation Sciences. The UST Hospital complex comprises the main St. Vincent Building, the Benavides Cancer Institute, the St. John Paul II Building, and the UST Hospital Clinical Division. The ₱900 million St. John Paul II Building, inaugurated in 2019, serves as the extension of the UST Hospital.

The northwest quadrant comprises the Central Seminary, the Botanical Garden, the Benavides Building, the Central Laboratory Building, and the Thomas Aquinas Research Complex (TARC). The Central Seminary was built in 1933 and was designed by Fernando Ocampo in Art Deco style. It also houses the Santísimo Rosario Parish and the Ecclesiastical Faculties. The Botanical Garden was first established in 1932 and continues to serve students in the research of Philippine flora and medicinal plants. TARC is home to the Graduate School.

The southwest quadrant includes the Buenaventura Garcia Paredes, O.P. Building (BGPOP), the swimming pool, the UST Publishing House, the Beato Angelico Building, and the football field. BGPOP, also known as the Thomasian Alumni Center, sits on the site of the old UST Gymnasium. The Art Deco facade of the old gymnasium was preserved for its historical significance. The Beato Angelico Building occupies the site of the old UST Press, which was constructed in 1953. The College of Architecture and the College of Fine Arts and Design transferred from the Roque Ruano Building to the Beato Angelico Building in 2003.

The southeast quadrant comprises the Alfredo M. Velayo College of Accountancy and Multi-Deck Carpark Building, the Albertus Magnus Building, the Roque Ruaño Building, and the Quadricentennial Pavilion complex. The Albertus Magnus Building houses the College of Education and the Conservatory of Music. The Roque Ruaño Building, which houses the Faculty of Engineering, was built in 1952 and designed by Julio Victor Rocha. It initiated the application of the Niemeyer-inspired brise soleil in local buildings. The Quadricentennial Pavilion was the venue of the CNN Philippines vice-presidential debates in 2016 and vice-presidential and presidential debates in 2022.

The Blessed Pier Giorgio Frassati Building is located across the main campus and is connected by the UST Link Bridge. The Frassati Building houses the Senior High School, College of Information and Computing Sciences, the DOST-TOMASInno Center, and several administrative offices. At its completion in 2019, it became the tallest educational building in the Philippines with 23 floors.

A stormwater drainage system that would help in mitigating UST's seasonal flood problem was completed in 2021. The underground system covers 7 street zones that can hold 11.25 million liters of water. As part of the celebration of the 2022 Thomasian Welcome Walk, the new UST block letters and the Bengal Tiger statue were unveiled at the Plaza Mayor.

The campus was declared a National Historical Landmark by the National Historical Commission of the Philippines in 2011. Four of the university's structures were also declared National Cultural Treasures by the National Museum namely, the Arch of the Centuries, Main Building, the Central Seminary, and the university's open spaces.

Satellite campuses

The UST in Manila is the main campus of the University of Santo Tomas System, which comprises two other existing campuses and two upcoming UST campuses in Santa Rosa, Laguna and General Santos. UST Angelicum College in Quezon City and University of Santo Tomas–Legazpi in Legazpi, Albay integrated with the UST System in 2017.

UST Angelicum College is located in the Santo Domingo Church complex in Quezon City. It offers basic education programs, a home study program, and undergraduate programs. The campus was founded as the Angelicum School in 1972 by Rogelio Alarcon. In 1995, undergraduate courses were offered, and the school was renamed Angelicum College in 1996. It offers programs in communication, entrepreneurship, human resource management, and information technology.

UST-Legazpi, formerly known as the Aquinas University of Legazpi, is located in Legazpi, Albay. It is the biggest catholic university in the Bicol Region, offering courses in the fields of law, medical, architecture, engineering, accountancy, teacher education, and arts and sciences. The university also has its own hospital.

UST Santa Rosa is a 40-hectare campus in Laguna that will offer undergraduate programs in science and engineering. The campus first broke ground on April 19, 2006, which was led by then university rector Tamerlane Lana and attended by UST board member and tycoon Lucio Tan. The development of the campus was delayed for several years by changes in the administration, the Quadricentennial Celebration in 2011, and prioritization of the construction projects in the main campus. On September 10, 2017, a second groundbreaking ceremony was held and led by then university rector Herminio Dagohoy. The construction of the first building in the campus, the UST–Dr. Tony Tan Caktiong Innovation Center, began in December 2020. The center was named after an alumnus and Jollibee Foods Corporation founder Tony Tan Caktiong, and it will be an annex of the Department of Science and Technology (DOST)-TOMASInno Center.

UST General Santos is an 80-hectare campus in southern Philippines that will initially offer programs in agricultural and fishery research, arts and humanities, business and accountancy, engineering and technology, and pharmaceutical sciences. The university acquired the land of the new campus in 1997, but the construction was stalled by land classification problems and local politics. In 2013, the local city council approved the rezoning of the university site to institutional from agricultural. The consultation and public hearing for the first phase of the establishment of the new campus was conducted in 2017. The construction broke ground on April 20, 2018, and was headed by then university rector Herminio Dagohoy.

Administration and organization

The university operates under the laws of the Roman Catholic Church and the Philippine government. The university authorities are the chancellor, the vice-chancellor, the rector, and the vice-rector. The Master of the Order of Preachers is the ex-officio chancellor of the university.  He appoints the rector of the university upon the approval of the Holy See. The Prior Provincial of the Dominican Province of the Philippines is the ex-officio vice-chancellor of the university. The rector is the chief executive officer of the university. He is assisted by the Council of Regents, the Academic Senate and the Economic Council. A dean heads an academic unit. He is assisted by a faculty council and a regent, who is a member Order of Preachers.

The university has 19 civil colleges, three ecclesiastical colleges, and three secondary schools. These academic units are organically interdependent with one another. A college is called a faculty, a college, a school, or an institute depending on the time it was founded. The "faculties" were founded during the Spanish colonial period, while "college" and "school" have been used since the American period. "Institutes" are organically independent units or adjuncts of a particular faculty or college. An adjunct institute that has attained enough enrollment is separated from its faculty or college and is made into a college in its own right. The College of Information and Computing Sciences was founded as an institute when it separated from the Faculty of Engineering in 2014. It was elevated to the status of a college in 2021.

The UST Central Seminary, the UST Ecclesiastical Faculties, and the UST Hospital have separate statutes but are still under the university.

UST has three basic education institutions, the UST Junior High School, the UST Education High School which serves as a laboratory for the College of Education, and the UST Senior High School. The UST Elementary School used to offer primary education for children in the K-12 levels, but stopped accepting applications for the K-Level sometime in the 2010s.

Academic profile
UST offers over 63 undergraduate programs in over 100 undergraduate specializations, 3 professional programs, over 50 master programs, and over 20 doctorate programs enrolling 40,375 students in 2019. The Graduate School (excluding the Faculties of Ecclesiastical Studies, Civil Law, and Medicine and Surgery) received the most freshmen with 1,371 students. In 2018, there were 371 foreign students, majority were from Asian countries. The UST Hospital, which serves as the training hospital of the Faculty of Medicine and Surgery, offers 21 residency training programs.

The university produced 8,131 graduates in 2022.

Admissions
UST holds the University of Santo Tomas Entrance Test (USTET) annually. The results are released on January 28, feast of day of St. Thomas Aquinas. In 2020 and 2021, the USTET was replaced by the UST Admission Rating (USTAR) because of the COVID-19 situation in the country. The USTAR is a score that computes a number of parameters obtained primarily from the academic records of the applicant. In 2021, the university received 48,411 applications for the USTAR, admitting 7,772 college freshmen. The Faculty of Engineering had the most freshmen for 3 consecutive years with 1,071 students. The USTET resumed in 2022 for the 2023–2024 school year.

The Faculty of Medicine and Surgery separately conducts a psychological examination for the first-year Doctor of Medicine program as part of the admission process. However, the scholastic standing and NMAT score are given the biggest weight in accepting applicants. Applicants must have a GWA score of at least 2.00/B+/86% and an NMAT score of at least 85%ile. About 480 candidates are accepted out of 1,700 to 1,900 applicants annually. No entrance examination was held in 2021. For the B.S. in Basic Human Studies (LEAPMed) program, the faculty shortlists the top 200 USTET college applicants using the UST Predictive Scoring. It comprises the USTET score or USTAR rating, the LEAPMed examination score, and the IQ score. After an interview and a psychological examination, only the top 90 applicants are accepted.

The Faculty of Civil Law also conducts a separate entrance examination for the degree of Juris Doctor.

Faculty and curriculum
As of 2019, UST has 2,164 faculty members, the most among private institutions and second in the country. The faculty comprises 1,160 master's degree holders (largest among private institutions) and 333 doctoral degree holders.

The academic year is divided into 2 terms. The academic performance is graded through the use of the 5-point numerical grading system: 1.00 as excellent, 3.00 as passed, and 5.00 as failed. All bachelor's degrees in the university include theology courses in their curricula.

In response to COVID-19 pandemic, classes at the university were delivered through the “enhanced virtual mode” for school years 2020–2021 and 2021–2022.

The Doctor of Medicine (M.D.) program offered by the Faculty of Medicine and Surgery is a four-year post-graduate degree that consists of three years of academic instruction in the medical school and one year of clinical clerkship in the UST Hospital. The faculty implements a blended integrated approach, adopting problem-based learning (PBL) as a teaching model in appropriate teaching-learning scenarios, and recently, outcome-based education (OBE), a curriculum that emphasizes the achievement of expected learning outcomes.

The Faculty of Civil Law offers a four-year professional law degree, which leads to Juris Doctor (J.D.). The curriculum mirrors the current model curriculum of the Legal Education Board. Master of Laws (LL.M.) and Doctor of Civil Law (D.C.L.) are offered at the Graduate School of Law.

Research

UST is a comprehensive research university. It is a member of the Philippine Higher Education Research Network (PHERNET) and Higher Education Regional Research Centers (HERRC). The university spent ₱91 million and ₱116 million in research in 2017 and 2018 respectively.

The university has several research centers, namely Research Center for Natural and Applied Sciences (RCNAS), Research Center for Culture, Arts, and the Humanities (RCCAH), Research Center for Social Sciences and Education (RCSSEd), Research Center for Health Sciences (RCHS), Center for Religious Studies and Ethics (CTRSE), Center for Health Research and Movement Science (CHRMS), Center for Conservation of Cultural Property and Environment in the Tropics (CCCPET), and the Center for Creative Writing and Literary Studies (CCWLS).

UST has recently discovered several plant species, namely Vanda ustii, Hedyotis papafranciscoi, Mycetia dagohoyana, Pyrostria arayatensis, and Freycinetia nonatoi. The university established UST Herbarium in the 1870s as part of the requirement of the Spanish government before UST could offer science degrees. Today, the Herbarium holds more than 11,000 identified plant specimens. It is also involved in plant curation, storage, and identification through DNA barcoding that aides in taxonomy and conservation.

The UST Zooplankton Ecology, Systematics, and Limnology Laboratory is home to the first and only organized assemblage of zooplankton samples and specimens (UST Zooplankton Reference Collection) collected within the Philippines. The UST Collection of Microbial Strains, as of 2019, holds 224 collections of indigenous, clinical, and biotechnological microbial strains. The institute is a member of ASEAN Network on Microbial Utilization (AnMicro), World Federation for Culture Collections and the Asian Consortium for the Conservation and Sustainable Use of Microbial Resources.

UST Eco Tigers I, a team composed of mechanical and electrical engineering students and faculty members from the Faculty of Engineering, ranked first in the prototype diesel category of the Shell Eco-Marathon Asia (SEMA) 2019 held in May 2019 in Selangor, Malaysia. The team also ranked 8th in Asia from 26 participating teams under the prototype category with energy source internal combustion engine (ICE).

College of Science professors Nicanor Austriaco and Bernhard Egwolf are members of the OCTA Research team that is associated with forecasts and analyses of the country's COVID-19 situation. They also developed an epidemiological model, UST CoV-2 Model, which released COVID-19 cases and death projections in Metro Manila. In the early part of the pandemic, the study recommended the need to increase the daily testing capacity that would potentially control the outbreak. Austriaco is currently conducting experiments on a yeast-based oral COVID-19 vaccine. A study group from the Faculty of Medicine and Surgery proposed a strategy to the government entitled, War Plan Mayon, to combat the pandemic through herd immunity. Faculty of Engineering professor Anthony James Bautista invented the LISA robot (Logistic Indoor Service), a telepresence and service assistant robot that delivers medicine and allows medical workers to manage isolated patients in the UST Hospital.

The university and the Philippine Department of Science and Technology (DOST) launched the DOST–TOMASInno Center, a technology business incubator (TBI), in 2019. The center was made possible through a research grant from the DOST.

The Center for Conservation of Cultural Property and Environment in the Tropics (CCCPET) provides researches, training, and cultural mapping of various national cultural heritage. It assisted in the development of San Pablo City Heritage District conservation guidelines, rehabilitation of Immaculate Conception Parish Church in Guiuan, Eastern Samar, and churches in Bohol and Leyte, cultural mapping of cities and municipalities in Baguio, Pampanga, Iloilo City, Samar, and Leyte, among others.

Several publications include Acta Manilana, the Antoninus Journal, The Asian Journal of English Language Studies, Boletin Ecclesiastico, Journal of Medicine, Tomas, UST Law Review, Philippine Journal of Allied Health Sciences, and Unitas. Established in 1922, Unitas is the oldest extant university-based academic journal in the country.
Acta Manilana, founded in 1965, is a multidisciplinary journal that features research papers from the Research Center for the Natural and Applied Sciences. The university journals has been available in a web portal since 2018.

UST is tenth in the country in the 2022 Alper-Doger Scientific Index, an institutional ranking system based on the performance and productivity of affiliated scientists. Thirty-nine Thomasian scientists placed in the ranking system.

Sustainability
The university consistently ranked in the Times Higher Education’s Impact Rankings which delivered the 17-part United Nations’ Sustainable Development Goals (SDGs). UST ranked first among Philippine universities in 2020 and third in 2021 and 2022. UST's engagement to help society predated the UN SDGs.

The UST Simbahayan Community Development Office, established in 2010 as the centerpiece project of the quadricentennial celebration, leads programs and projects in community development, research, and instruction that involves students, alumni, staff, and national partner communities in becoming agents of social transformation. The term Simbahayan is a combination of the words simbahan, bayan, and tahanan, which means church, nation, and home respectively. In 2018, UST partnered with a Lumad school to provide accessible education for indigenous people of Mindanao.

In 2021, the Center for Advanced Materials for Clean Energy Technologies based on Indigenous Materials (CAMCET) was established under the partnership of the UST Research Center for Natural and Applied Sciences, Mapua University, Adamson University, and the Department of Science and Technology.
In 2022, UST joined the Austrian embassy in Manila and the Film Development Council of the Philippines in organizing an SDG film festival and cineforum.

Libraries and archives
As of 2017–2018, the Miguel de Benavides Library held over 360,000 books and logged 10,948,882 access to electronic resources remotely. In 2018–2019, it received over 1,100,000 visitors. The main library is located in a six-storey building along Alberto Drive. It has sixteen sections and five branch libraries: Ecclesiastical, Health Science, Education High School, Junior High School, and Senior High School.

As of 2017, the Health Sciences Library had 20,904 titles and 25,311 volumes. It was assessed to have sound and good-quality collections based on Doody's Core Titles (DCT) among five select medical libraries in the Philippines.

The Antonio Vivencio del Rosario UST Heritage Library keeps some 30,000 volumes published between 1492 and 1900. Among the collections are La Guerra Judaica (1492) by  Josephus Flavius, De revolutionibus orbium coelestium (1543) of Nicolaus Copernicus, and the first book ever printed in the Philippines, Doctrina Christiana (1593).

In partnership with the Union Bank of the Philippines, the library launched the Lumina Pandit (spreading the light) rare books exhibit in 2011. The partnership included a three-phase program: the conservation, digitization, and publication of the university's archives and historical collections. In 2015, Unionbank gave another ₱30 million to fund the digitization of historical collections from 1492 to 1900 as part of the Lumina Pandit II. In 2017, the conservation efforts continued with Semper Lumina (always the light). The project launched a 6-volume catalogue of rare books and periodicals and the UST Digital Library. As of the launching, 1.5 million pages have been scanned by the library for restoration and online publication, including the first-edition of José Rizal's Noli Me Tángere.

The university received the annual prize in the category of education and science in Casa Asia Awards 2021 in Spain. The library was also recognized for its efforts in preserving its heritage and digitizing its collections.

The Archivo de la Universidad de Santo Tomas (AUST) houses old books, various incunabula, papal bulls, university records, and original documents relevant to the university foundation. AUST holds the biggest collection of extant ancient Baybayin scripts in the world. Two 17th-century deeds of sale documents in Baybayin, the oldest of their kind, were declared National Cultural Treasure by the National Archives of the Philippines. The scholastic records of José Rizal in Ateneo Municipal de Manila and UST are also preserved in the archives.

The archives’ collection of ancient Baybayin scripts were declared as National Cultural Treasures by the National Archives of the Philippines in 2014. The Dictionario Hispanico-Sinicum or Vocabulario de la Lengua Chio Chiu (A Lexicon of the Changzhou Language), an early 17th century Spanish-Chinese dictionary was discovered by Spanish and Taiwanese scholars in the archives in 2017. It is considered to be the world’s oldest extant and largest Spanish-Chinese dictionary.

Museums and collections

The UST Museum of Arts and Sciences, founded in 1871 as the Gabinete de Fisica (Cabinet of Physics), is the oldest museum in the Philippines. It houses the oldest zoological collection in the Philippines, with over 100,000 specimens collected and curated in the 19th century by Castro de Elera, a Dominican priest and professor. De Elera also published Catalogo Sistematico de toda La Fauna de Filipinas (Catalog of Philippine Fauna) in 1895. It was the first systematic work in zoology in the country. The museum also holds 4,899 species and subspecies of Philippine mollusks, the most among all mollusk museums in the world. Two of the five chairs used by the popes who visited the university are in permanent display.

The UST Hall of Visual Arts features restored paintings from various foreign and local artists, as well as works from several national artists. The collection includes a portrait of José Rizal by Victorio Edades, El Studio Natural of Félix Resurrección Hidalgo, and four masterpieces of Fernando Amorsolo. The museum's restoration project was funded by grants from the early editions of the UST Christmas Concert Gala.

The Hall of Philippine Religious Images houses images collected from the various provinces of the country. Part of its collection includes the largest ivory crucifix ever made in the Philippines, which was controversially featured in the October 2012 issue of the National Geographic.

Other museums include the UST Medicine Museum, Dr. Julieta Hayag-Manchanda UST Anatomy Gallery, and UST Beato Angelico Art Gallery. The Anatomy Gallery serves as a showcase of all the teaching materials in anatomy. It features thick glass containers that holds dissected specimens for gross anatomy, neuroanatomy, and embryology.

Publishing

The UST Publishing House (USTPH) was established in 1996 through the merger of the Santo Tomas University Press and the UST Printing Office. USTPH evolved from the UST Press, which was founded in 1593 by Francisco de San Jose. It is one of the oldest continuing press in the world today, only next to Cambridge University in England.

The publishing house maintains a bookstore which is located at the ground floor of the UST Main Building. Regular publications include Academia, the international bulletin of university, and The Varsitarian, the student newspaper.

Rankings and reputation

UST is one of only three private universities granted with the five-year autonomous status by the Commission on Higher Education (CHED). It is the highest grant given by CHED, which allows universities to implement programs and increase tuition fees with less government regulation.

Twenty-six programs in the university were declared as Centers of Excellence (COE) and Centers of Development (COD) by CHED, the most of any private educational institutions and second in the country. COE status was granted to 13 programs, and COD status was also given to 13.  UST is one of the only three Philippine universities recognized as Center of Excellence in the Doctor of Medicine program. The architecture program was one of the only two architecture programs in the country recognized as Center of Excellence.

UST has been cited by the Philippine Association of Colleges and Universities Commission on Accreditation (PACUCOA) as the university with the highest number of accredited programs in the country since 2011. As of December 2021, PACUCOA has accredited 59 programs of the university. UST also has the most Level IV accredited programs, with 26, and has the highest number of candidate programs.

UST is the first Philippine university to be awarded by the Quacquarelli-Symonds (QS) Stars with four stars and five stars as an institution in 2015 and 2021 respectively. The university achieved 5 stars for teaching, employability, internationalization, and facilities while scoring 4 stars for academic development. QS also gave a 5-star rating to the Doctor of Medicine program. It has been ranked in the QS Asian University Rankings 2021 (186), QS World University Rankings 2021 (801–1000), QS Graduate Employability Rankings 2022 (251–300), and THE Impact Rankings 2020 (301–400).

Four master's degree programs of the UST Graduate School were ranked as among the best in Far East Asia by Eduniversal in 2021. The Masters in Human Resource Management was ranked 20th in Far East Asia and 3rd in the Philippines. The Masters in Communication and Masters in Economics were ranked 30th in Far East Asia and 3rd in the country. The Masters Public Administration placed 40th in the region and 2nd in the Philippines. UST was also recognized as one of the top 1,000 institutions in the world that offers programs in business and allied fields.

UST became an associate member of the ASEAN University Network-Quality Assurance (AUN-QA) group in 2016. In 2020, it was the first associate member to receive an institutional certification. AUN-QA also certified 18 programs from the university.

All six engineering programs of the university, namely civil, chemical, electric, electronics, industrial, and mechanical, were accredited by the Engineering Accreditation Commission of the Accreditation Board for Engineering and Technology (ABET) in 2020.

International linkages
UST has partnerships and linkages with 171 foreign academic institutions in 32 countries. A dual-degree program in Ph.D. Built Environment/Architecture is offered in collaboration with the University of Reading. The university also offers a ladderised program in Master in Public Health (International) in partnership with the University of Leeds. The partnership between the university and the Duke University allow nursing students of both universities to attend global health courses and participate in clinical immersions. Select fourth year students from the B.S. Medical Technology program can participate in the International Internship Program at the Mahidol University in Thailand.

Student life

The university marks events with a variety of ceremonies largely influenced by the Hispano-Filipino Dominican Catholic culture and Philippine culture. This includes the Misa de Apertura and Discurso de Apertura, the Mass and lecture opening the academic year. As one of the oldest traditions in the university, the Discurso began in 1866. The Thomasian Welcome Walk where freshmen pass under the Arch of the Centuries at the start of their education at the university. The UST Paskuhan, a series of monthlong campus events that celebrate the significance and value of Christmas. It features reenactments of the Christmas story, a campus-wide banquet, live concerts, and light and pyrotechnic displays.

Just before graduation, the academic year ends with the campus-wide Baccalaureate Mass, the Ceremony of the Light, and send-off rites. The highlight of the closing ceremonies is the graduating students' recessional parade through the Arch of the Centuries, which signifies the culmination of their Thomasian life.

Despite the COVID-19 situation in the country, most of the traditional activities such as the Misa de Apertura and Discurso de Apertura, the Thomasian Welcome Walk, Paskuhan, and closing ceremonies continued virtually. The Welcome Walk, ROARientation, and Send-off Rites, in particular, were streamed live in a Minecraft server. In 2022, the university returned to holding these traditional festivities in person. The closing ceremonies for the classes of 2020 to 2022 were held in July, while the Welcome Walk for the classes 2026 and homecoming rites for the classes of 2024 and 2025 resumed in August.

As is customary in many Catholic institutions, activities and traffic within the campus stop at 12:00 and 18:00 PST (GMT+8) for the Angelus and at 15:00 PST for the 3 o’clock Prayer to the Divine Mercy daily.

The tiger statue in Plaza Mayor, which was installed in 2022, gained media attention when it transformed into a wishing well as students filled its open mouth with coins. The statue was barricaded the following day.

A sports competition among the university colleges is the annual Thomasian Goodwill Games, which was inaugurated in the school year 2002–2003. Sporting events include basketball, volleyball, and football.

Student organizations
UST hosts hundreds of student organizations which include a wide range of disciplines: religious, cultural, performing, media, socio-civic, and student service.

The Central Student Council is the highest governing student body of the university. The Student Organizations Coordinating Council (SOCC), is the central body of all recognized organizations of the university.

The UST Singers is a mixed choral ensemble that has won Choir of the World twice and Choir of the World Champion of Champions in the Llangollen International Musical Eisteddfod. Founded in 1927, the UST Symphony Orchestra, is composed of faculty and students that performs regularly as a resident company at the Cultural Center of the Philippines. The UST Salinggawi Dance Troupe, both Cheer and Dance subteams, have won local and international competitions.

In the 1960s, the first LGBT organization, Tigresa Royal, was established but was never recognized by the university. In 2013, HUE, a new LGBT organization was established. Like Tigresa Royal, the university also denied HUE's recognition as a university organization. In 2015, the university ordered numerous organizations to take down all rainbow-themed profile pics of its members in social media after the legalization of same-sex marriage in the United States. The order was defied by numerous students of the university, marking the beginning of the UST Rainbow Protest. In July 2016, various student organizations supported the filing of the SOGIE Equality Bill. In March 2018, during the passage of the bill, numerous UST student organizations, including UST Hiraya, a feminist organization, backed the bill's passage.

Literature and media
The Varsitarian is the student publication of the university. Established in January 1928 by students from the UST Literary Club led by Jose Villa Panganiban, it is the oldest Catholic newspaper in the Philippines. It is published fortnightly. The lampoon issue is called The Vuisitarian, a portmanteau of Buwisit, a Tagalog expression used for unlucky events, and Varsitarian. The publication hosts the annual Inkblots, a national campus journalism fellowship that gathers student journalists, journalism and communication enthusiasts, and media professionals. The UST Center for Creative Writing and Literary Studies hosts the National Writers’ Workshop annually. The fellows are graduate students and professionals that are selected based on the merits of their submitted works. The Academia is the international bulletin of the university.

The Tiger Media Network, the university's broadcasting arm,  produces, content through the Tiger TV and the Tiger Radio with the use of IPTV and internet. DZST (860 kHz) was an AM radio station owned by the university from 1950 to 1963. The frequency eventually became the DZRV-AM or Radyo Veritas. In 2013, in partnership with Radio Veritas, the university launched the Blessed Pope John Paul II UST–Radio Veritas electronic community board located at the corner of Espana Boulevard and Lacson Avenue.

The USTv Students’ Choice Awards was an annual award event that recognized TV programs and personalities that promoted Filipino Christian values.

Greek life
The Faculty of Civil Law and Faculty of Medicine and Surgery had several Greek organizations on campus, but in 2018, following the death of civil law student Horacio Castillo III, the UST Office of Student Affairs suspended the recognition of all fraternities and sororities. Tau Mu Sigma Phi, founded in 1946, is the oldest among the 10 Greek groups in the Faculty of Medicine and Surgery.

Athletics

In 1920, UST and other catholic universities and colleges in Manila organized a sports league called Liga Catolica. Four years later, members of the Liga Catolica organized themselves to form the National Collegiate Athletic Association (NCAA). UST won its first basketball championship and only NCAA championship in 1930. In 1932, the university seceded from the NCAA and formed the Big 3 League with the University of the Philippines and National University. The Big 3 League and Far Eastern University eventually formed the University Athletic Association of the Philippines (UAAP) in 1938.

The varsity sports teams, originally called the "Glowing Goldies", have since been renamed as the "Growling Tigers" beginning the 1992–1993 UAAP season. The women's teams are called the "Tigresses", while the juniors' (high school) teams are the "Tiger Cubs".

UST has the most general championship titles among the 8 member schools.  UST has won the seniors division 45 times in the 74 seasons that the title has been awarded, including the record high 14-year run. The juniors team yielded 21 titles out of 26 seasons. The university is one of the only four universities that participates in all the UAAP events. UST has the most championships in baseball, beach volleyball, judo, swimming, taekwando and poomsae, tennis, and table tennis, or 7 out of the 16 sports in the UAAP.

UST has won the men's basketball title 18 times in the UAAP since 1938 and one in the NCAA, bringing the total to 19. In 2006, the Tigers captured the basketball championship defeating the Ateneo Blue Eagles in two of the three games held. With the championship, the UST tied with the UE Red Warriors with 18 UAAP men's basketball titles, behind the league-leading FEU Tamaraws with 20. The Tigers reached the finals four times in the last decade. In 2012, the Tigers, led by Jeric Fortuna and Carmelo Afuang, finished second at the end of eliminations with a 10–4 record, but were swept by the Ateneo Blue Eagles in the finals. In 2013, the fourth seed Tigers defeated the top seed National Bulldogs in the semi-finals. The team, led by Jeric Teng and Karim Abdul, clinched the first game of the finals, but the DLSU Green Archers went on to win the title. In 2015, the Tigers finished the elimination round as the no. 1 seed with an 11–3 record. UST, led by mythical five members Kevin Ferrer and Ed Daquioag, lost in three games to FEU Tamaraws in the finals. In 2019, the Tigers entered the stepladder semifinals with an 8–6 card. It defeated the FEU Tamaraws in a one-game playoff for third seed. The Tigers, led by Renzo Subido and Soulemane Chabi Yo, swept the Kobe Paras-led UP Fighting Maroons in two games to face the Ateneo Blue Eagles in the finals. The Eagles won the series in two games. Chabi Yo and Mark Nonoy were recognized as the season Most Valuable Player and Rookie of the Year respectively.

The Golden Tigresses, the women's volleyball team, is the UAAP's second-winningest team with 16 titles. Former players include national team members Mary Jean Balse, Aiza Maizo, Maika Angela Ortiz, Aleona Denise Santiago, Cherry Ann Rondina, and Ejiya Laure.. The men's and women's beach volleyball teams are the winningest team in the same league.

The Tiger Jins, the taekwando and poomsae teams, have the most number of championships across all divisions in the UAAP.

The Salinggawi Dance Troupe and the UST Yellow Jackets have won 8 UAAP Cheerdance Competition titles from 1994 to 1996 and 2002 to 2006.

Thomasians cheer the "Go USTe!" chant in supporting the Thomasian athletes in the playing field. UST Yellow Jackets founder Michael Ismael Flores created the iconic chant in 1990, getting inspiration from Vanilla Ice's Ninja Rap.

The university sports facilities include a football field, a swimming pool, a tennis court, a sand court and at least 9 basketball courts (3 courts at the Practice Gym, a covered court beside the Practice Gym, Education court, P. Noval court, Seminary gym and open courts, and Frassati gym). The Quadricentennial Pavilion houses a 5,792-seat arena, a fitness center, a two-lane overall track, and training halls for dance, badminton, fencing, judo, and table tennis.

Notable people

Persons affiliated to the university, either as students, faculty members, or administrators, are known as "Thomasians". UST alumni and faculty include 11 canonised Catholic saints, the current master of the Order of Preachers, 2 cardinals (José Lázaro Fuerte Advíncula Jr., the 33rd and reigning Archbishop of Manila, and José Tomás Sánchez) 4 Presidents of the Philippines (Manuel L. Quezon, José P. Laurel, Sergio Osmeña, and Diosdado Macapagal), 9 Chief Justices, former Speaker of the House of Representatives, 20 national artists, a National Scientist, and 5 billionaires.

Thomasians in the field of medicine include at least 13 out of 28 previous Secretaries of Health, the current surgeon general, co-founders of Makati Medical Center (Mariano M. Alimurung, José Y. Forés, and Raúl G. Forés), founding chairman of the Asian Hospital and Medical Center Jorge García, Belo Medical Group foundress Vicki Belo, and Aivee Clinic foundress Aivee Teo. May Parsons, a UST Nursing alumna, administered the world's first COVID-19 vaccine to a patient in the United Kingdom.

Thomasians have played significant roles in the establishment of other educational institutions. These include the first Filipino president of the University of the Philippines Ignacio Villamor, the first Filipino dean of University of the Philippines College of Medicine Fernando Calderon, founder of FEATI University and De La Salle Araneta University, founder of Lyceum of the Philippines University José P. Laurel, co-founder of Manila Central University Alejandro M. Albert, founder of Virgen Milagrosa University Foundation Martín Posadas, founder of Manuel S. Enverga University Foundation Manuel Enverga, and founders of University of Perpetual Help System Jose G. Tamayo, Josefina Laperal Tamayo, Antonio Laperal Tamayo.

In sports, UST alumni include Olympians Jethro Dionisio in shooting, Donald Geisler and Tshomlee Go in taekwondo, and Ernest John Obiena in pole vault.

Recipients of the honoris causa include Douglas MacArthur, Juan Carlos I, Jaime Sin, and Corazon Aquino.

Several highways in Metro Manila are named after Thomasians. These include EDSA, Rizal Avenue, Ortigas Avenue, Quezon Avenue, Gregorio Araneta Avenue, Lacson Avenue, Legarda Street, Victorino Mapa Street, Recto Avenue and Osmeña Highway.

In popular culture
UST has been referenced in popular culture, including in works of film, television, and literature. In One More Chance (2007), lead couple Popoy (John Lloyd Cruz) and Basha (Bea Alonzo), are Engineering and Architecture graduates of UST, respectively. Basha is also a member of the UST Salinggawi Dance Troupe. She wears the 2003 UAAP Cheerdance Competition costume. In Yesterday, Today, Tomorrow (2011), Eunice (Eula Caballero), daughter of the lead character Maricel Soriano is a UST High School student and a member of the UST Salinggawi Dance Troupe. She wears the high school uniform and the UST costume of the 2011 UAAP Cheerdance Competition. In Alone/Together (2019), Raf, played by Enrique Gil, attends UST as a Biology undergraduate. He is seen wearing the UST College of Science uniform. He also becomes a graduate of the UST Faculty of Medicine and Surgery. Gil also appeared in a video cheering the Go USTe! chant as part of the movie's promotional campaign.

In El Filibusterismo (1891 novel), Father Millon and Placido Penitente are a professor and a student in the university respectively. Thomasians are also featured in the Wattpad novel, Raining in España, Chasing in the Wild, Golden Scenery of Tomorrow.

Notes

References

External links

University of Santo Tomas – official website
Historical documentary synopsis of the University of Santo Tomas of Manila from its foundation to our day, Fr. Juan Sanchez y García, Santo Tomas University Press, Manila, 1929
El tricentenario de la Universidad de Santo Tomás de Manila. Relacion de las fiestas, actos y certámenes celebrados en esta ciudad de Manila durante los dias 16, 17, 18, 19 y 30 de diciembre del aṅo 1911. Lo publica la junta organizadora del tricenternario. El tricentenario de la Universidad de Santo Tomas de Manila (1611–1911) (''), published in Manila, 1912

 
1611 establishments in the Philippines
ASEAN University Network
Catholic universities and colleges in Manila
Dominican educational institutions in the Philippines
Educational institutions established in the 1610s
Education in Sampaloc, Manila
National Historical Landmarks of the Philippines
Pontifical universities
Research universities in the Philippines
Spanish colonial infrastructure in the Philippines
Universities and colleges in Manila
University Athletic Association of the Philippines universities
Reportedly haunted locations in the Philippines